Hakozakichō or more formally Nihonbashi Hokazakichō is a neighborhood of Nihonbashi, Chuo-ku, Tokyo. It is the location of Tokyo City Air Terminal, and the headquarters of numerous companies, including Yoshinoya and IBM Japan.

References

Nihonbashi, Tokyo
Chūō, Tokyo
Neighborhoods of Tokyo